Acanthocobitis (Paracanthocobitis) mackenziei also known as the robust zipper loach is a species of ray-finned fish in the genus, or subgenus, Paracanthocobitis. This species is the most widely distributed species of Paracanthocobitis and is known from the Ganges River basin of Nepal and India, the Meghna River basin in Bangladesh, the Mahanadi River basin in eastern India, and the upper Indus River basin of northern India and eastern Pakistan. Fishbase treats P. (A). mackenziei under Nemachilus mackenziei as a synonym of Acnthocobitis botia.

References

mackenziei
Fish described in 1910